The Yasar Dogu Tournament 1989, was a wrestling event held in Istanbul, Turkey between 18 and 19 January 1989. This tournament was held as 17th.

This international tournament includes competition includes competition in men's  freestyle wrestling. This ranking tournament was held in honor of the two time Olympic Champion, Yaşar Doğu.

Medal table

Medal overview

Men's freestyle

Participating nations

References 

Yasar Dogu 1989
1989 in sport wrestling
Sports competitions in Istanbul
Yaşar Doğu Tournament
International wrestling competitions hosted by Turkey